Contract Killers is a 2008 action film about a female assassin on the run from the law. The film was directed by Justin B. Rhodes, and stars Frida Farrell, Nick Mancuso, and Rhett Giles with an appearance by Paul Cram.

Plot
A hitman works for the CIA.

Cast
 Frida Farrell as "Jane"
 Nick Mancuso as "Witkoff"
 Steve Boergadine as "Winston Scott"
 Paul Cram as "Chuck Dittmer"
 Rhett Giles as "Purnell"
 G. Anthony Joseph as "Monoven"
 Wolf Muser as "Targonsky"
 Christian Willis as "Lars"

Reception
Brent Simon, writing for Shared Darkness said, "There's no cool, breezy Mr. & Mrs. Smith-type snappishness here, and the film isn't briskly shot or slickly constructed enough to stack up with any of the Bourne films, a wayward spy series that it clearly wants to emulate."

References

External links
 
 

2008 films
American action films
English-language Trinidad and Tobago films
Films set in Trinidad and Tobago
Trinidad and Tobago drama films
2000s crime action films
Films about contract killing
2000s English-language films
2000s American films